Auro Soares de Moura Andrade (19 September 1915 – 29 May 1982), commonly known as Auro de Moura Andrade or Moura Andrade, was a Brazilian lawyer and politician. He was born in a wealthy family of farmers from the countryside, son of the cattle rancher Antônio Joaquim de Moura Andrade, known as "The King of the Cattle".

Revolution of 1932
At the age of 17, was part of the Constitutionalist Revolution of 1932, graduating later in law in the Law School of the Largo São Francisco (USP), where he developed intense political activity, signaling his future in the Brazilian public life.

As the head of the periodicals "A Urna" (The Ballot Box) and "O Democrata" (The Democrat), fought against the government of Getúlio Vargas, which ended closing them.

Great speaker, characteristic that would follow him in his parliamentary life, Andrade was lawyer and held many positions in the State, being also director of the Commercial Association.

Political career
In 1947, Auro was elected state deputy by the National Democratic Union (UDN) and, in 1950, federal deputy. In 1954, was elected senator by the National Labor Party (PTN). Brilliant parliamentarian, joined the Social Democratic Party (PSD), which he would become highlighted. In 1961, was elected president of the Senate, which position he would hold for 7 years, always being re-elected.

In 1958, was defeated after running for governor of São Paulo, occasion which Carvalho Pinto was elected with the support of Jânio Quadros.

In 1962, was re-elected senator for São Paulo with more than 1 million votes.

Jânio Quadros resignation
Auro was president of the National Congress when president Jânio Quadros resigned in August 1961. Received his resign-letter and immediately called in the Congress. In 4 minutes and a half read the letter, and stated that Jânio was not in Brasília anymore and invited all the parliamentarians for the sworn of his constitutional successor, which would occur in 10 minutes. 20 minutes after the summoning, declared vacancy of the presidential position, as Vice President João Goulart was in an official trip to China. A deputy threw him a microphone and another tried to take the letter from him, but in less than half an hour sworn Ranieri Mazzilli, president of the Chamber of Deputies. This meant the foreshadowing of the nearly Coup D'etat. It was denied to Goulart his legitimate right to Jânio Quadros succession.

Had an important acting in the changing to the parliamentary system, which made possible the inauguration of Vice President João Goulart as President of the Republic. Along with Mazzilli and Ernesto Geisel, received Jango in the airport when he returned to Brasília on 5 September.

Never were clear the reasons that made Auro declare vacancy of the Presidency in 1 April 1964. In the occasion, João Goulart was in Rio Grande do Sul, as the press reported in those days and, besides that, there was the reading of a letter forwarded to the National Congress by then Chief of Staff of the Presidency of Republic Darcy Ribeiro, communicating that Goulart trip was official.

Was invited to be Prime Minister, as long as he left written a resign-letter in the hands of the President. Refused to accept the imposition, saying to Goulart that such suggestion would make him - Moura Andrade - "not Prime Minister, but Last".

1964 coup d'etat
In March 1964, Moura Andrade participated, in São Paulo, in the March of the Family with God for Liberty, public act against the government. In the 30th of the same month, launched a manifest to the nation declaring disruption between the Legislative and the Executive powers, called in the militaries to position themselves in the defense of the institutions.

On the next day, the coup happened and, even with President Goulart in the office and in Brazilian soil, Moura Andrade, in a tumultuous session of the Congress, presided by him, declared the Presidency vacant, going personally, by foot, ahead of a legion of congressmen, to the Planalto Palace, to inaugurate the deputy Ranieri Mazzilli as President of the Republic. Stated in this day, before ending the session:

Was appointed by many parliamentarians to compose, as Vice President, the ticket that would elect marshal Castelo Branco for President, but however, resigned the candidacy in the Second Round of the indirect election, on 11 April 1964, and José Maria Alkmin replaced him, who practically had no opposition.

Disenchanted with the coup that he supported, Moura Andrade, with the boldness that characterized him, publicly stated that "Japona wasn't gown", after being falsely accused by a superior official in charge of an inquiry. Because of that, even having great prestige, was defeated in partisan convention that chose the ARENA party candidates for the Senate to represent São Paulo in 1970, what made his re-election impossible.

Was ambassador of Brazil in Spain for a year and a half between 1968 and 1969 when returned to Brazil, leaving the politics. Was president of the Development Bank of São Paulo State, in 1982, when passed away.

In retrospective (notably with the end of the Military Regime), the role of Moura Andrade in 1964 started to be severely questioned. Many criticize him for, in his attributions as president of the National Congress, for giving institutional support for the illegitimate power takeover by the Armed Forces (contradicting the Constitution of 1946), instead of maintaining the republican order and assure the continuity of a government elected democratically.

Books 
 Um Congresso contra o arbítrio: Diários e memória. Rio de Janeiro: Nova Fronteira, 1985.

See also 
 Pascoal Ranieri Mazzilli
 1964 Brazilian coup d'etat

Explanatory notes

References 

1915 births
1982 deaths
People from Barretos
National Democratic Union (Brazil) politicians
Social Democratic Party (Brazil, 1945–65) politicians
National Renewal Alliance politicians
Members of the Chamber of Deputies (Brazil) from São Paulo
Presidents of the Federal Senate (Brazil)
Ambassadors of Brazil to Spain
20th-century Brazilian lawyers
Candidates for Vice President of Brazil